Dolnja Stara Vas (in older sources also Dolenja Stara Vas) is a village in the Municipality of Škocjan in southeastern Slovenia. The area is part of the historical region of Lower Carniola. The municipality is now included in the Southeast Slovenia Statistical Region. 

The local church is dedicated to the Holy Trinity and belongs to the Parish of Škocjan.

References

External links

Dolnja Stara Vas at Geopedia

Populated places in the Municipality of Škocjan